Shawn Morelli (born March 29, 1976, in Greenville, Pennsylvania) is an American Paralympic three-time gold medalist in cycling at the 2016 Summer Paralympics and the 2020 Paralympic Games, winning four overall medals in both road and track cycling. She graduated from the Marion Military Institute and was commissioned as a Second Lieutenant engineer officer in the United States Army in 1996. She graduated from Pennsylvania State University with a history major in 1998. She is also a veteran of Operation Iraqi Freedom and the war in Afghanistan. After being injured in 2007, she began competitive para-cycling in 2010 and has participated in world championships since 2014. She is originally from Saegertown, Pennsylvania and is a resident of Leavenworth, Kansas. She retired as a Major in the United States Army.

See also
 List of Pennsylvania State University Olympians

References

External links
 
 
 
 
 

1976 births
Living people
American female cyclists
Paralympic cyclists of the United States
Paralympic gold medalists for the United States
Paralympic silver medalists for the United States
Paralympic medalists in cycling
Cyclists at the 2016 Summer Paralympics
Cyclists at the 2020 Summer Paralympics
Medalists at the 2016 Summer Paralympics
Medalists at the 2020 Summer Paralympics
United States Army personnel of the War in Afghanistan (2001–2021)
United States Army officers
Marion Military Institute alumni
21st-century American women
Pennsylvania State University alumni
Cyclists from Pennsylvania
People from Crawford County, Pennsylvania
American people of Italian descent
Military personnel from Pennsylvania